

This is a list of the National Register of Historic Places listings in Carter County, Tennessee.

This is intended to be a complete list of the properties and districts on the National Register of Historic Places in Carter County, Tennessee, United States.  Latitude and longitude coordinates are provided for many National Register properties and districts; these locations may be seen together in a map.

There are 13 properties and districts listed on the National Register in the county, including 1 National Historic Landmark.

See also National Register of Historic Places listings in Washington County, Tennessee for additional properties in Johnson City, a city that spans the county line.

Current listings

|}

Former listings

|}

See also

 List of National Historic Landmarks in Tennessee
 National Register of Historic Places listings in Tennessee

References

Carter
 
Buildings and structures in Carter County, Tennessee